Jerry H. Lewis (born 1956) is an American former politician who was a member of the Arizona Senate, representing Legislative District 18 (covering western and central Mesa and small section of the Salt River Pima-Maricopa Indian Community) from 2011 to 2013. He is a member of the Republican Party. He was elected to office by defeating incumbent Russell Pearce in a recall election November 8, 2011. In reaction to the election result, Pearce said, "If being recalled is the prize for keeping one's promises, then so be it"; and Lewis said, "We now have an opportunity to heal the divide in Mesa."

Lewis holds a master's degree from Brigham Young University.

Lewis is a Latter-day Saint who served as a missionary in Hong Kong. Lewis has also served as a bishop and stake president in the Church of Jesus Christ of Latter-day Saints. At the time of his election to the state senate he was serving as vice president of the Grand Canyon Council of the Boy Scouts of America.

References

Further reading
 Arizona Central, "Russell Pearce recall election: Hear from the candidates," October 24, 2011

External links

 Official campaign website

1956 births
Living people
American leaders of the Church of Jesus Christ of Latter-day Saints
Republican Party Arizona state senators
Brigham Young University alumni
American Mormon missionaries in Hong Kong
20th-century Mormon missionaries
Politicians from Mesa, Arizona
Latter Day Saints from Arizona